Rina or RINA may refer to:


People and fictional characters
 Rina (given name), a list of people and fictional characters
 Kento Rina, Indian politician
 Mahfuza Rahman Rina, Bangladeshi politician
 Tongam Rina (born 1979), Indian journalist and human rights activist
 Ita Rina, stage name of Yugoslav actress Tamara Đorđević (1907-1979)
 Rina Nakayama, Japanese voice actress
 Rina (rapper), Kosovo-Albanian rapper, singer and songwriter Rina Balaj
 A member of South Korean girl group Weki Meki
 Rina (wrestler), Japanese professional wrestler

Acronyms
 Recursive Internetwork Architecture, a computer network architecture proposed as an alternative to the TCP/IP model
 Registro Italiano Navale, the Italian shipping register
 Royal Institution of Naval Architects, London

Other uses
 Rina (EP), the debut extended play by British-Japanese singer Rina Sawayama
 Rina (TV series), a Mexican telenovela, or its main character
 Hurricane Rina (2011), which made landfall in the Yucatan Peninsula 
 Tropical Storm Rina (2017), which formed in the Central Atlantic

See also 
 Rinə, Azerbaijan, a village and municipality
 Salvatore Riina (1930–2017), leader of the Sicilian Mafia